The Women's time trial of the 2010 UCI Road World Championships cycling event took place on 29 September in Melbourne, Australia.

Emma Pooley became Great Britain's first gold medal winner in the discipline, recording a time 15 seconds quicker than Germany's Judith Arndt – finishing second for the third time – with New Zealand's Linda Villumsen finishing marginally behind Arndt in third, taking her second consecutive third place in the time trial.

Route
The course covered 22.8 km.

Final classification

References

External links

Women's time trial
UCI Road World Championships – Women's time trial
2010 in women's road cycling